The Braibach or Tierser Bach (also Breibach, Breienbach, Braienbach) is a stream in South Tyrol, Italy.

References 
Civic Network of South Tyrol 

Rivers of Italy
Rivers of South Tyrol